Tangerine  is a submarine telecommunications cable system segment crossing the English Channel linking the United Kingdom and Belgium.

It has landing points in:
Dumpton Gap, Broadstairs, Kent, United Kingdom
Mariakerke near Ostend, West Flanders, Belgium

The cable contains four fibre bundles, each of 48 fibres, and a total cable length of 121 km.

Submarine communications cables in the English Channel
Belgium–United Kingdom relations